Aleksey Manuelevich Rios (born 14 May 1987) is a Belarusian professional footballer of partly Peruvian and Spanish descent.

Club career 
Having started his career at Dinamo Minsk Rios joined FC Shakhtyor Soligorsk in 2005 at the age of 17. At Soligorsk he debuted in the Belarusian Premier League in 2007 where he played for eight years before joining FC BATE Borisov for the 2015 season.

Honours
Shakhtyor Soligorsk
Belarusian Cup winner: 2013–14

BATE Borisov
Belarusian Premier League champion: 2015, 2016, 2017, 2018
Belarusian Cup winner: 2014–15, 2019–20
Belarusian Super Cup winner: 2015, 2016, 2017

International career 
Rios made his debut for Belarus on 31 August 2016, after coming on as a substitute at half time in a friendly match against Norway.

International goal
Scores and results list Belarus' goal tally first.

Personal life 
Rios was born to a Peruvian father and a Belarusian mother in Minsk. He is married.

References

External links
 FC BATE profile
 
 

1987 births
Living people
Footballers from Minsk
Association football midfielders
Belarusian people of Peruvian descent
Belarusian people of Spanish descent
Belarusian footballers
Belarus international footballers
Belarusian Premier League players
FC Shakhtyor Soligorsk players
FC BATE Borisov players
FC Dinamo Minsk players